The 1980 America's Cup was held in September 1980 at Newport, Rhode Island. The US defender, Freedom, skippered by Dennis Conner, defeated the Australian challenger, Australia, skippered by James Hardy, four races to one. This was the last successful defense of the cup by the New York Yacht Club and the last defender designed by the naval architectural firm Sparkman & Stephens. It was the sixth unsuccessful challenge by Australia and the third by Alan Bond.

Freedom had beaten Courageous and Clipper to become the defender. Australia had beaten France III, Lionheart and Sverige to become the challenger.

Crew
Freedom's crew included skipper Dennis Conner, navigator Halsey Herreshoff, tactician Dennis Durgan, trimmer John Marshall, grinders Rives Potts and Kyle Smith, mastman Robert "Bobbie" Campbell, pitman Donald Kohlmann, bowman Lexi Gahagan, Jonathan Wright and Tom Whidden.

Australia's crew included skipper James Hardy, Noel Robins, tactician Ben Lexcen, port trimmer John Bertrand, Scott McAllister, John Longley and Kenneth Judge.

Results

References

 
1980
America's Cup
1980 in American sports
12-metre class